Go to School is the second studio album by American band The Lemon Twigs. It was released on August 24, 2018 through 4AD. Subtitled "a musical by the Lemon Twigs", it is a concept album about a chimpanzee raised as a human boy.

Track listing

Charts

Accolades

References

2018 albums
4AD albums
The Lemon Twigs albums